Robbio is a city and comune (municipality) in the Province of Pavia in the Italian region Lombardy, located about 50 km southwest of Milan and about 45 km west of Pavia. It is part of Lomellina traditional region.

Robbio borders the following municipalities: Borgolavezzaro, Castelnovetto, Confienza, Nicorvo, Palestro, Rosasco, Vespolate.

History
The area of Robbio was settled since Neolithic times. A Roman centre name Redobium is attested by Pliny the Elder. Later it was a Lombard town and, later, a possession of the Catholic diocese of Vercelli. Around the 11th century it was acquired by the De Robbio family, who ruled it, together with the neighbouring area, until the 13th century, when it was contended between Vercelli and Pavia. In 1220 the latter definitively acquired it through a diploma issued by Emperor Frederick II.

Then part of the Duchy of Milan, it was entrusted to several feudal families. In 1748 it was acquired by the Kingdom of Sardinia and, in the 19th century, it became part of the province of Pavia under the newly formed Kingdom of Italy.

Main sights
Castello di Robbio: medieval Castle, now a public park.
San Pietro: 13th century Romanesque church housing 16th-century frescoes attributed to Tommasino da Mortara.
San Michele: 15th-century church with a late Gothic-style façade.
San Valeriano: originally a 5th/6th century church, originally entitled to St. Andrew), enlarged by Cluniac monks in the late 11th century. The apse is now separated from the main building.

Notable people

People closely associated with Robbio include:

 Silvio Piola (September 29, 1913 - October 4, 1996), a famous Italian soccer player.
 Enzo Emanuele (June 10, 1977), a medical researcher.

References

External links
 Official website